Monstera subpinnata is a species of flowering plant native to Bolivia, Peru, Ecuador and Colombia. It grows as an epiphyte. The plant is best known for its pinnate leaves, which are unusual within the genus Monstera. The species can grow as tall as 12 m (39 ft), with leaves growing as large as 40 cm (16 in) long and 30 cm (12 in) wide.

References 

Flora of Bolivia
Flora of Peru
Flora of Ecuador
Flora of Colombia
subpinnata
Taxa named by Adolf Engler
Plants described in 1879